Peter B. Cotton (born 1939) is a British Gastroenterologist best known for his advancement in digestive disease, pioneering and naming the ERCP procedure and creating the Digestive Disease Center at the Medical University of South Carolina.

Biography
Cotton was born in England, where his father was a rural family physician. He was educated at Cambridge University and St. Thomas Hospital Medical School (London), where he graduated in 1963.  He became interested in endoscopy in the late 1960s with the introduction of flexible fiberscopes and developed endoscopy units at St. Thomas’ Hospital, and at the Middlesex Hospital, which pioneered and evaluated many diagnostic and therapeutic procedures, particularly ERCP. 

In 1986, he left England to become Professor of Medicine and Chief of Endoscopy at Duke University, Durham, North Carolina.  He developed a state of the art endoscopy center there while also maintaining his interests in teaching, new techniques, and careful outcome evaluation. He moved to Charleston, South Carolina in 1994 to initiate and lead a Digestive Disease Center at the Medical University of South Carolina, dedicated to multi-disciplinary patient care, and the research and education needed to enhance it.

Cotton's bibliography includes over 900 publications, with more than 300 original contributions in peer reviewed journals, and 10 books.“Practical Gastrointestinal Endoscopy” (co-authored by Christopher Williams) is the primary Gastrointestinal Endoscopy teaching text available in seven languages.

Professional awards 
Cotton has been the recipient of awards including:
 1978 Fellow of the Royal College of Physicians
 2002 Fellow of the Royal College of Surgeons (London)
 2004 Rudolph Schindler award of the American Society for Gastrointestinal Endoscopy

Positions held 
He has been active in National and International organisations, and has given invited lectures and demonstrations in more than 50 countries.  He helped form the British Society for Digestive Endoscopy, became its president, and served the British Society of Gastroenterology as its vice president and treasurer.  He was secretary of the European Society for Gastrointestinal Endoscopy, and president of the Pancreatic Society of Great Britain. He is principal investigator of an NIH-funded multi-center randomised sham-controlled study of sphincterotomy in Sphincter of Oddi dysfunction.

Key papers

References

1939 births
Living people
British gastroenterologists
British medical researchers